Aksel Fossen (29 November 1919 – 31 August 2009) was a Norwegian politician for the Labour Party.

Biograpjy
Fossen was born in Strand.

He was elected to the Norwegian Parliament from Hordaland in 1969, and was re-elected on three occasions.

On the local level he was a member of Odda municipality council from 1959 to 1971, serving as deputy mayor from 1962 to 1969. From 1963 to 1967 he was also a member of Hordaland county council.

Outside politics he was a factory worker in Odda.

References

1919 births
2009 deaths
People from Strand, Norway
Members of the Storting
Labour Party (Norway) politicians
Hordaland politicians
Recipients of the King Haakon VII Freedom Medal
20th-century Norwegian politicians